K-1 Grand Prix '97 Final was a kickboxing event promoted by the K-1 organization. It was the fifth K-1 World Grand Prix final involving eight of the world's best heavyweight fighters (+95 kg/209 lbs), with all bouts fought under K-1 Rules. The eight finalists had all qualified via elimination fights at the K-1 Grand Prix '97 1st Round.  Also on the card was a four-man tournament for featherweight kickboxers (57 kg/126 lbs) based in Japan and a local 'Super Fight', with all bouts fought under K-1 Rules.  In total there were fourteen fighters at the event, representing seven countries.

The tournament winner was Ernesto Hoost who won his first K-1 Grand Prix final by defeating reigning champion Andy Hug by third round majority decision.  The event was also notable for two of the fights in the quarter finals - with both Francisco Filho and Andy Hug defeating their opponents by knockout at 15 seconds of the first record.  It was held at the Tokyo Dome in Tokyo, Japan on Sunday, November 9, 1997 in front of a huge crowd of 54,500 spectators.

K-1 Grand Prix '97 Final Tournament

K-1 Japan Featherweight Grand Prix Tournament

Results

See also
List of K-1 events
List of male kickboxers

References

External links
K-1 Official Website
K-1sport.de - Your Source for Everything K-1

K-1 events
Kickboxing in Japan
Sports competitions in Tokyo